Juan Carlos Wasmosy Monti (born December 15, 1938) was the president of Paraguay from August 15, 1993 until August 15, 1998. He was a member of the Colorado Party, and the country's first freely elected president, as well as the first civilian president in 39 years.

Biography 
Born in Asunción, Paraguay, Wasmosy trained as a civil engineer and became head of the Paraguayan consortium working on the Itaipu Dam. During this project, he amassed a large amount of wealth. He served as minister of integration under President Andrés Rodríguez.

His ancestors Dániel Vámosy and József Vámosy, immigrated to South America from Debrecen, Hungary in 1828. At that time, the surname of the family was Vámosy; it was Hispanicized to Wasmosy. His relative, Alceu Wamosy (1895–1923), a famous Brazilian writer, is also from this ancestry. Juan Carlos Wasmosy went to see the home town of his ancestors in 1995 during his official visit to Hungary.

Rodríguez endorsed Wasmosy as his successor in the 1993 elections. He won with approximately 40 percent of the vote in what is generally acknowledged to be the first honest election in the country's history (the country had gained independence in 1811), with Domingo Laino finishing a close second. Although there were confirmed cases of fraud, a team of international observers led by Jimmy Carter concluded that Wasmosy's margin of victory was large enough to offset any wrongdoing. Carter also noted that opposition candidates took 60 percent of the vote between them. This was a remarkable figure given Paraguay's long history of autocratic rule. For most of the country's history, particularly during Alfredo Stroessner's 35-year dictatorship, the opposition was barely tolerated when it was even permitted at all. At the time of Stroessner's ouster in 1989, the country had only known two years of true democracy in its entire history.

However, he became very unpopular when he appointed many of Stroessner's supporters to government posts. He also failed to continue the limited reforms of Rodríguez.

Lino Oviedo, head of the Paraguayan army, allegedly attempted a coup in April 1996. Wasmosy countered by offering Oviedo a ministerial position, but soon imprisoned him. 

Wasmosy was barred from running again in 1998; in response to Stroessner's authoritarian excesses, the 1992 constitution barred any sort of reelection for the president. Raúl Cubas stood for the Colorado Party presidential nomination and won.

In 2002, Wasmosy was convicted of defrauding the Paraguayan state and was himself sentenced to four years in prison. The sentence was later appealed.

References

External links

WASMOSY, Juan Carlos International Who's Who. accessed September 3, 2006.
Biography by CIDOB

1938 births
Living people
People from Asunción
Paraguayan people of Hungarian descent
Paraguayan people of Italian descent
Colorado Party (Paraguay) politicians
Presidents of Paraguay
Government ministers of Paraguay
Paraguayan engineers
Civil engineers
Paraguayan politicians convicted of crimes
Prisoners and detainees of Paraguay
Paraguayan prisoners and detainees
Grand Croix of the Légion d'honneur
Recipients of the Medal of the Oriental Republic of Uruguay